The Thur waterfalls are two cascades located on the river Thur approximately ten minutes walking from the village square of Unterwasser in the canton of St. Gallen, Switzerland, The water cascades down from steep rock faces, and on highest point drops from . The road along the waterfalls was developed in 1927 and includes three observation decks.

References

Waterfalls of Switzerland
Landforms of the canton of St. Gallen
WThur